Amerifax is a breed of beef cattle, developed in the US in the 1970s. This breed is a combination of American Angus (5/8th) and Beef Friesian (3/8th).

References
 Breeds of Livestock - Amerifax (based on Mason, I.L. 1996. A World Dictionary of Livestock Breeds, Types and Varieties Fourth Edition. C.A.B International. 273 pp.)

Cattle breeds
Cattle breeds originating in the United States